Utu is a 1983 New Zealand film directed and co-written by Geoff Murphy; starring Anzac Wallace as Te Wheke, a warrior who sets out to get vengeance after British forces kill his people, Bruno Lawrence and Kelly Johnson. Sometimes described as "a Maori Western", Utu was reputed to have one of the largest budgets for a New Zealand film up until that time.

The film screened out of competition at the 1983 Cannes Film Festival, and became the second most successful local movie released in New Zealand to that date. Positive reviews in America, including a rave review from Pauline Kael, helped win Murphy directing work in Hollywood.

Partly inspired by events from Te Kooti's War, the film tells of a Māori soldier setting out to get utu, or vengeance, on his former allies after the British army destroys his home village and kills his uncle. The film is set in the 1870s.

In 2013, partly thanks to the longtime existence of an alternative cut of the film aimed at international audiences, which Geoff Murphy had never been happy with, he completed work on a restored and recut version. Utu Redux, as it is known, premiered at the Wellington International Film Festival on 26 July 2013.

Plot

Set in New Zealand's North Island during the New Zealand Wars, Utu follows Te Wheke (Anzac Wallace), a Maori Captain in the British army. When Te Wheke's unit comes across a village that has been slaughtered he, recognising it as his own, deserts the army and organises a guerilla force to terrorise the invading British forces. When the unit destroys the home of Williamson (Bruno Lawrence) and kills his wife, Williamson vows to hunt down Te Wheke and kill him himself.  Meanwhile, army scout Wiremu (Wi Kuki Kaa) and recent Boer War veteran Lieutenant Scott (Kelly Johnson) aim to track down Te Wheke themselves, also using guerilla warfare techniques against the will of corrupt Colonel Elliot (Tim Eliott).

Cast
 Anzac Wallace – Te Wheke
 Bruno Lawrence – Williamson
 Tim Eliott – Col. Elliot
 Kelly Johnson – Lt. Scott
 Wi Kuki Kaa – Wiremu
 Tania Bristowe – Kura
 Ilona Rodgers – Emily Williamson
 Merata Mita – Matu
 Faenza Reuben – Hersare
 Tama Poata – Puni
 Martyn Sanderson – Vicar
 John Bach – Belcher
 Dick Puanaki – Eru
 Sean Duffy – Cpl. Jones
 Ian Watkin – Doorman
 Betty MacKay – Organist

Production

Utu was one of the largest film productions to have taken place in New Zealand until that point. Its grand scale warranted the use of a large second unit, which again was rare in the context of a young New Zealand cinema industry. Wallace prior to being cast as Te Wheke had some experience acting on television.

Murphy was interested in authenticity, trying to keep it as period-accurate as possible. To accomplish this many of the extras were local Maori and in order for Te Wheke's moko to look realistic, Anzac Wallace would spend 4 hours having it applied each day of shooting.

Reception

The film's immediate reception was less positive than Murphy's earlier works, although still positive. Locally the film was very commercially successful, being New Zealand's second highest-grossing film at the time (behind Murphy's previous effort, Goodbye Pork Pie).

Critically the film had a mixed positive reception. Filmmaker Costa Botes noted that “Utu'''s shotgun approach to the great New Zealand film ultimately leaves it feeling episodic and tangled". New Yorker film critic Pauline Kael however gave the film an exceptionally positive review, saying that "[Geoff Murphy] seems to be directing with a grin on his face, [...] the ferocity of these skirmishes and raids is played off against an Arcadian beauty that makes your head swim". Similarly Variety said "Murphy has produced powerful images and strong performances".

The film prompted public discussion about New Zealand history. Film academic Roger Horrocks said "Utu was an uneven film but succeeded in stirring up more discussion of New Zealand history than any recent book has done".

Quentin Tarantino in a 2016 interview with Radio New Zealand praised Utu'' as "hands down the best New Zealand movie of all time".

Track listing
 "Theme From Utu" 
 "Drummers"
 "Patrol"
 "Destroyed Village"
 "Te Wheke Stalks Emily"
 "Moko"
 "The Raid; After the Raid"
 "Williamson Retaliates"
 "Quadruple Barrelled Shotgun; The Army Approaches Te Puna"
 "Waiata Tangi; Kura and Henare"
 "Night Sentry"
 "Fishing; After the Battle"
 "Williamson Reflects" 
 "Te Wheke's Trek"
 "Williamson Prepares for Utu" 
 "Death of Te Wheke (lament) and Finale"
The soundtrack was recorded by the New Zealand Symphony Orchestra conducted by Sir William Southgate.

References

External links

Utu at New Zealand Film Commission
Utu at NZ On Screen

1983 films
1983 drama films
1980s New Zealand films
1980s historical drama films
Māori-language films
New Zealand Wars films
New Zealand historical drama films
British Empire war films
Films directed by Geoff Murphy
Films set in New Zealand
Films shot in New Zealand
Films set in the 1870s
Films about Māori people
1980s English-language films